The 2021 Virginia Tech Hokies women's soccer team represented Virginia Tech during the 2021 NCAA Division I women's soccer season. It was the 29th season of the university fielding a program and 18th competing in the Atlantic Coast Conference. The Hokies were led by 11th year head coach Charles Adair and played their home games at Thompson Field.

The Hokies finished the season 12–6–2, 5–3–2 in ACC play to finish in eight place.  They did not qualify for the ACC Tournament as only six teams were invited.  They received an automatic bid to the NCAA Tournament where they defeated Ohio State in the First Round before losing to Arkansas in the Second Round to end their season.

Previous season 

Due to the COVID-19 pandemic, the ACC played a reduced schedule in 2020 and the NCAA Tournament was postponed to 2021.  The ACC did not play a spring league schedule, but did allow teams to play non-conference games that would count toward their 2020 record in the lead up to the NCAA Tournament.

The Hokies finished the fall season 5–8–0, 4–4–0 in ACC play to finish in a tie for sixth place.  They were awarded the seventh seed in the ACC Tournament based on tiebreakers.  In the tournament they lost to North Carolina in the Quarterfinals.  They finished the spring season 3–1–0 and were not invited to the NCAA Tournament.

Squad

Roster

Team management

Source:

Schedule 

Source:

|-
!colspan=6 style=""| Exhibition

|-
!colspan=6 style=""| Non-Conference Regular season

|-
!colspan=6 style=""| ACC Regular Season

|-
!colspan=6 style=""| NCAA Tournament

Rankings

2022 NWSL Draft

Source:

References 

Virginia Tech
Virginia Tech
2021
Virginia Tech women's soccer
Virginia Tech